"River of Love" is a song by Australian singer-songwriter Rick Price. It was released as the first single from his second studio album,  Tamborine Mountain. The song peaked at No. 18 in Australia. At the ARIA Music Awards of 1995, "River of Love" was nominated for ARIA Award for Best Male Artist but lost to Solid State Rhyme by Diesel.

Track listing
Australian CD single (661391.2)
 "River of Love"	
 "Love Never Dies"

Charts

References

Rick Price songs
1995 songs
1995 singles
Columbia Records singles
Songs written by Rick Price